Nefedev is a lunar impact crater located on the lunar far side near the southern pole. The crater is located directly adjacent to the Schrödinger crater and East of craters Ganswindt and Idelson. Nefedev was adopted and named after Russian astronomer Anatoly Nefedev by the IAU in 2009.

References

External links 
 LAC-144 area — Map of southern lunar pole

Impact craters on the Moon